Gennadiy Sergeyevich Prigoda (born 2 May 1965) is a former freestyle swimmer from Russia, who competed twice at the Summer Olympics first for the Soviet Union in 1988, and then for the Unified Team in 1992. The sprinter won four Olympic medals: two silver and two bronze. Prigoda trained at Armed Forces sports society in Kuibyshev.

He started swimming in a club aged 7, together with his elder brother, Alexandr Prigoda, who also became a top Russian swimmer. Between 1985 and 1991, he won three medals at the world championships, five medals at the European championships, and ten national titles in freestyle and medley relay events. Gennadi Touretski considers him as his most technically gifted trainee. Prigoda retired from active swimming in 1992. He graduated with a degree in pedagogy from the Lesgaft National State University of Physical Education in Saint Petersburg, and started his own business with a travel company. He later defended PhD in pedagogy and in 2005 returned to the Lesgaft University to work as a professor of management.

References

1965 births
Living people
Soviet male swimmers
Russian male swimmers
Swimmers at the 1988 Summer Olympics
Swimmers at the 1992 Summer Olympics
Olympic swimmers of the Soviet Union
Olympic swimmers of the Unified Team
Olympic silver medalists for the Soviet Union
Olympic silver medalists for the Unified Team
Olympic bronze medalists for the Soviet Union
Olympic bronze medalists for the Unified Team
Olympic bronze medalists in swimming
Russian male freestyle swimmers
World Aquatics Championships medalists in swimming
European Aquatics Championships medalists in swimming
Medalists at the 1992 Summer Olympics
Medalists at the 1988 Summer Olympics
Olympic silver medalists in swimming